Nabila Hakim Ali Khan (born 11 October 1972) is a Pakistani politician and Member of the Provincial Assembly of the Punjab from May 2013 to May 2018.

Early life and education
Nabila Hakim Ali Khan was born on 11 October 1972 in Sahiwal.

She earned a Bachelor of Arts degree before graduated in 1999 from Bahauddin Zakariya University from where received a Bachelor of Laws degree.

Political career

Nabila Hakim Ali Khan was elected to the Provincial Assembly of the Punjab as a candidate of Pakistan Tehreek-e-Insaf on a reserved seat for women in 2013 Pakistani general election.

References

Living people
Women members of the Provincial Assembly of the Punjab
Punjab MPAs 2013–2018
1972 births
Pakistan Tehreek-e-Insaf politicians
21st-century Pakistani women politicians